Mensaka is a 1998 Spanish drama film written and directed by Salvador García Ruiz (in his directorial feature debut) consisting of an adaptation of the novel Mensaka by José Ángel Mañas. It stars Gustavo Salmerón, Tristán Ulloa, Adrià Collado, Laia Marull, María Esteve, Lola Dueñas and Guillermo Toledo.

Plot 
The plot focus on a group of young people belonging to different social classes. It tracks the relationships between David and Fran (who both play in an underground rock band in Madrid alongside Javi) with their girlfriends Bea and Natalia as well as the mishaps of Javi and romantic interest Cristina. Meanwhile, Laura, Javi's little sister, has formed a gang and deals drugs.

Cast

Production 
The film was produced by Tornasol Films and it had the participation of TVE.

Release 
Distributed by Alta Films, Mensaka was theatrically released in Spain on 30 April 1998.

Reception 
Jonathan Holland of Variety deemed the film to be "a gritty, compassionate study of post-adolescent life in contemporary Spain", and "a good showcase for young local acting talent".

Ángel Fernández-Santos of El País gave a positive review and highlighted the craft of Salvador García in his debut film (managing to uplift a "storyline of little substance") and the performances of Salmerón, Ulloa, Marull and Dueñas.

The "unapologetic brand of female adolescent subjectivity" represented by the character of Laura (Javi's "demonic little sister"), displaying a take on the wild child archetype, has been drawn out as a highlight of "an unexpectedly striking movie" by Matthew J. Marr.

José Angel Mañas commented that, out of all the transpositions of his works, Mensaka was the one he liked the most.

Accolades 

|-
| align = "center" rowspan = "3" | 1999 || rowspan = "3" | 13th Goya Awards || Best Adapted Screenplay || Salvador García Ruiz ||  || rowspan = "3" | 
|-
| Best New Director || Salvador García Ruiz || 
|-
| Best New Actor || Tristán Ulloa || 
|}

See also 
 List of Spanish films of 1998

References

Bibliography 
 
 

1998 drama films
Spanish drama films
1990s Spanish-language films
Films set in Madrid
Tornasol Films films
Films based on Spanish novels
1990s Spanish films
1998 directorial debut films